Red and White Mountain is a remote 12,816-foot-elevation (3,906 meter) mountain summit located on the crest of the Sierra Nevada mountain range in northern California, United States. It is situated in the John Muir Wilderness on the shared boundary of Sierra National Forest with Inyo National Forest, and along the common border of Fresno County with Mono County. The nearest higher neighbor is Red Slate Mountain,  to the north-northwest.

History
This mountain's descriptive name was applied by Theodore S. Solomons in 1894. It refers to the red slate and white granite that it is composed of. The first ascent of the summit was made July 18, 1902, by James S. Hutchinson, his brother Lincoln Hutchinson, and Charles A. Noble via the West Ridge. Norman Clyde first climbed the  Northeast Ridge on July 3, 1928.

Climate
According to the Köppen climate classification system, Red and White Mountain is located in an alpine climate zone. Most weather fronts originate in the Pacific Ocean, and travel east toward the Sierra Nevada mountains. As fronts approach, they are forced upward by the peaks, causing them to drop their moisture in the form of rain or snowfall onto the range (orographic lift). This climate supports a permanent ice field on the north slope. Precipitation runoff from the northwest side of this mountain drains into Red and White Lake thence Fish Creek, from the northeast side into Big McGee Lake and headwaters of McGee Creek, and from the south aspect into Grinnell Lake, thence Laurel Creek.

Gallery

See also

 List of mountain peaks of California

References

External links
 Weather forecast: Red and White Mountain

Inyo National Forest
Sierra National Forest
Mountains of Mono County, California
Mountains of Fresno County, California
Mountains of the John Muir Wilderness
North American 3000 m summits
Mountains of Northern California
Sierra Nevada (United States)